The 8th Robert Awards ceremony was held in 1991 in Copenhagen, Denmark. Organized by the Danish Film Academy, the awards honoured the best in Danish and foreign film of 1990.

Honorees

Best Danish Film 
 Dance of the Polar Bears – Birger Larsen

Best Actor in a Leading Role 
 Tommy Kenter - Dance of the Polar Bears

Best Actress in a Leading Role 
 Dorota Pomykała –

Best Actor in a Supporting Role 
  -

Best Actress in a Supporting Role 
 Kirsten Olesen -

Best Cinematography 
 Dirk Brüel –

Best Sound Design 
 Niels Arild – War of the Birds

Best Editing 
 Leif Axel Kjeldsen –

Best Score 
 Fini Høstrup –

Best Documentary Short 
 1700 meter fra fremtiden – Ulla Boje Rasmussen

Best Foreign Film 
 Cinema Paradiso – Giuseppe Tornatore

See also 

 1991 Bodil Awards

References

External links 
  

1990 film awards
1991 in Denmark
Robert Awards ceremonies
1990s in Copenhagen